Miriam Toukan (also known as Miriam Tukan) is a singer from a Palestinian Christian family in I'billin, and an Arab citizen of Israel.

She has performed at festivals including the Cyprus Rialto World Music Festival, and her project Quartetoukan. She has also participated in marches for peace with other women singers and activists in Spain, Germany, Brazil, and Italy.

In 2012, she performed an Arabic version of Fun's song "We Are Young".
From 2013 to the present, she is the leader of Quartetoukan, a musical project that aims to unite cultures and people through music.

Toukan is a member of various movements for the advancement of peace in the Middle East and the end of the Israeli-Palestinian conflict, such as Combatants for Peace and Women Wage Peace. Toucan participated in several peace marches in various countries with the Women Wage Peace, and sang in Arabic the song "Mother's Prayer" which became the movement's anthem.

Discography 

 2008: Christmas Eve
 2011: Miriam Toukan

References

External links

 https://www.ondacero.es/temas/miriam_toukan-1

Living people
Kokhav Nolad contestants
University of Haifa alumni
People from I'billin
Year of birth missing (living people)